Comblanchien is a commune just to the south of Nuits-Saint-Georges in the Côte-d'Or department in eastern France.

Geology
Comblanchien lies in the Côte d'Or escarpment. The Jurassic limestone of the Côte includes a pink-veined marble called Pierre de Comblanchien which was laid down in the Bathonian epoch.

The stone has characteristics similar to those of marble and is notable for the variety of its shades of colour, the pink of bindweed (Convolvulus) and beige. Its veining harmonizes with any decorative style. It is not susceptible to frost damage, is fine-grained and capable of accepting a polish. It may be slippery if used polished, as a flooring. Its most notable use was in l'Opéra in Paris.

The quarries lie in the Côte overlooking Route Nationale 74, north and south of the village and similar stones are found in other places along the same vein.

History
During World War II Comblanchien was severely hit by the Germans. The resistance was strong here, which led the Germans to retaliate. On August 21, 1944, much of the village was destroyed and eight people killed by Nazi forces.

Winemaking
Wine produced from the vineyards surrounding Comblanchien can be labelled under the Côte de Nuits Villages appellation.

Population

See also
Communes of the Côte-d'Or department

References

Communes of Côte-d'Or
Limestone
Côte-d'Or communes articles needing translation from French Wikipedia